Samba in Berlin is a 1943 Brazilian musical comedy film directed by Luiz de Barros and starring Mesquitinha, Laura Suarez and Dercy Gonçalves. It is a World War II film part of the popular tradition of chanchadas, aiming to poke fun at Nazi Germany with whom Brazil was now at war.

Cast
Mesquitinha
Laura Suarez
Dercy Gonçalves
Léo Albano
Brandão Filho 
Manoel Rocha
Grande Otelo 
Jesus Ruas 
Zbigniew Ziembinski
Grijo Sobrinho
Matilde Costa 
Túlio Berti

References

Bibliography
Dennison, Stephanie & Shaw, Lisa. Popular Cinema in Brazil. Manchester University Press, 2004.

External links

1943 musical comedy films
1943 films
Brazilian musical comedy films
Brazilian black-and-white films
Films set in Berlin
Films set in Rio de Janeiro (city)
1940s Portuguese-language films
Films directed by Luiz de Barros
Cinédia films